Ju Fu ( third century), courtesy name Xiaoxing, was a military officer of the state of Shu Han in the Three Kingdoms period of China. His name is sometimes rendered as Gou Fu.

Life
Little information is recorded about Ju Fu's life. However we know that he was from Hanchang County, in Baxi Commandery, which was around present-day Qu County, Sichuan the same as another general of Shu Han, Wang Ping and may have been a foreigner from the local tribes of Baxi. Ju Fu was known for his many qualities, he was a loyal, brave and generous man. He made severals achievements in battle and for this; his reputation, deeds and ranks were so high that they were considered near those of Wang Ping. The highest position he reached was General of the Left (左將軍). He was also enfeoffed as the "Marquis of Dangqu" (封宕渠侯).

The Chronicles of Huayang would later add that during the late times of Shu Han, when Zhang Yi and Liao Hua served as General of Chariots and Cavalry, the common people would often say: "Before we had Wang and Ju, and these days we have Zhang and Liao." This indicate that just like Liao Hua and Zhang Yi careers mirror themselves, Wang Ping and Ju Fu's must have been closely related.

See also
 Lists of people of the Three Kingdoms

References

 Chen, Shou (3rd century). Records of the Three Kingdoms (Sanguozhi).
 Chang Qu (4th century). Chronicles of Huayang (Huayang Guo Zhi).
 Pei, Songzhi (5th century). Annotations to Records of the Three Kingdoms (Sanguozhi zhu).

Shu Han generals
Han dynasty generals from Sichuan
3rd-century deaths
Year of birth unknown